"There's a Girl in Texas" is a debut song co-written and recorded by American country music artist Trace Adkins. It was released in April 1996 as his debut single, and was served as the lead-off single from his debut album Dreamin' Out Loud. The song peaked at No. 20 on the Billboard Hot Country Singles & Tracks chart in August 1996.  The song was written by Adkins and Vip Vipperman.

Critical reception
Wendy Newcomer of Cash Box wrote that "It’s a smooth rendition of the essential radio-receptive debut and should have no problem finding a home on car radios and jukeboxes everywhere."

Chart performance

References

Songs about Texas
1996 debut singles
1996 songs
Trace Adkins songs
Song recordings produced by Scott Hendricks
Capitol Records Nashville singles
Songs written by Trace Adkins